Bell's Sports Centre, formerly known as the Gannochy Trust Sports Complex, is located in Perth, Scotland. Built in 1968, it stands at the western edge of the city's North Inch park, adjacent to Balhousie Castle.

It was surpassed by London's Millennium Dome in 1999.

Owned by the Gannochy Trust, it is operated by Live Active Leisure on behalf of Perth and Kinross Council.

History
In the early 1960s, then lord provost of Perth, W. G. Farquharson discussed plans for a sports facility in the city. In 1964, it was announced that the Gannochy Trust, founded in 1937 by Arthur Kinmond Bell and of which Farquharson was chairman, would fund the estimated £150,000 cost of the building's construction. The venue was to be named after Bell, due to his love of sport and of his concern for the health of Perth's citizens.

Construction of the facility began on 16 September 1966, and its foundation stone was laid by Farquharson on 20 March 1967. David K. Thomson, who had succeeded Farquharson as lord provost, presided over the ceremony.

The planned opening was originally in March 1968, but a fire broke out in the building, severely damaging the dome. Most of the 36 arches had to be replaced. After the extensive repairs, Bell's Sports Centre opened on 15 October 1968, six months behind schedule.

The Gannochy Sports Pavilion was built on the dome's southeastern side between 1975 and 1979, designed by Esmé Gordon. The two buildings were linked and modernised between 1989 and 1991, with squash courts added.

Bell's Sports Centre was one of the venues used during the 2011–12 UEFA Futsal Cup.

Design
The facility has  of floor space.

Facilities
Its floor space accommodates courts for tennis, badminton, volleyball, netball and basketball. It also has running track that equates to one mile per eleven laps, a 60-metre sprint track, long-, high- and triple-jumps, pole vault, hammer, discus and javelin. It also has facilities for indoor football, hockey, practice cricket wickets and golf.

Former British number-one tennis player Elena Baltacha formerly practiced at Bell's Sports Centre with her father Sergei Baltacha in the early 1990s, when her father played for St Johnstone, the city's professional football club.

In 2021, Live Active Leisure announced plans to invest £750,000 to build a new fitness gym and exercise studio at the centre. The plans were of concern to the city's various sport clubs who would be losing the use of the centre's coaching hall.

Adjacent to the pool is the Dewar's Centre, which offers ice skating and curling.

Perthshire RFC use the pavilion's changing rooms, although their home field is officially the North Inch.

There is also a restaurant on site.

References

Works cited
Duncan 2012

External links 
 

Sports venues in Perth, Scotland
Sport in Scotland
1968 establishments in Scotland